Willem Bartsius (1612, Enkhuizen – 1657, Enkhuizen), was a Dutch Golden Age painter.

Biography
According to Houbraken, who mentioned his sister as Paulus Potter's mother, his father was Paulus Bertius, the city secretary of Enkhuizen, and his mother was descended from the House of Egmont.

According to the RKD he became a member of the Alkmaar Guild of St. Luke in 1634 where he took on the pupil Abraham Meyndertsz, but in 1636 he moved to Amsterdam and little is known of him after 1639. He is known for both landscapes and portraits, including a schutterstuk in Alkmaar.

References

SK-A-2214 A captain with ceremonial commander's staff at the Rijksmuseum
Image database (search term: Bartsius) of Stedelijk Museum Alkmaar shows schutterstuk by Bartsius, completed in 1634
Willem Bartsius on Artnet

1612 births
1657 deaths
Dutch Golden Age painters
Dutch male painters
People from Enkhuizen
Painters from Alkmaar